Mahbubur Rahman (5 January 1940 – 27 March 2021) was a Bangladeshi lawyer and politician.

Career 
Rahman was a leader of the Bangladesh Nationalist Party. He was a member of parliament for Noakhali-3 constituency. He served as 4 time MP and 9 years as Minister in 9 Ministries including  Education Minister under Hussain Muhammad Ershad cabinet from 1986 to 1988. He switched from Bangladesh Nationalist Party to Jatiya Party (Ershad) in 2008.

Rahman is the vice-chairperson of Bangladesh Foreign Trade Institute.

Rahman died of COVID-19 in 2021.

Personal life
Rahman had 4 sons and 2 daughters. His daughter Farah Mahbub has followed him into law, and eventually she became justice of Dhaka High Court.

References

1940 births
2021 deaths
People from Chatkhil Upazila
Bangladesh Nationalist Party politicians
8th Jatiya Sangsad members
Jatiya Party politicians
Education ministers of Bangladesh
Religious affairs ministries of Bangladesh
4th Jatiya Sangsad members
7th Jatiya Sangsad members
Deaths from the COVID-19 pandemic in Bangladesh